The 2011 FIBA Americas Championship for Men, later known as the FIBA AmeriCup, was the qualifying tournament for FIBA Americas, at the 2012 Summer Olympics men's basketball tournament, in London. This FIBA AmeriCup tournament was held in Mar del Plata, Argentina, from August 30 to September 11, 2011. Argentina won the title, defeating Brazil, 80–75, in the final match. This was the country's second AmeriCup championship.

Host
FIBA Americas named Mar del Plata, Argentina the host of the 2011 competition on May 24, 2010 at a meeting in San Juan.  Games were played at Polideportivo Islas Malvinas, which seats more than 8,000 fans. Toronto and Rio de Janeiro also bid for the tournament before FIBA awarded the competition to then world number-one ranked Argentina. Toronto was eliminated in the first round of voting before Mar del Plata beat Rio de Janeiro in the final round 13 votes to 3. Toronto's bid was seen as superior to the other two, but due to the lack of government backing was not awarded the tournament.

Venue

Qualification

The ten teams originally selected to receive invitations for the tournament were the host team, the top three finishers at the 2010 South American Basketball Championship, the top two teams in the North America Sub-Zone, and the top four finishers at 2010 Centrobasket.  Because the host country, Argentina, came in second at the 2010 South American Basketball Championship, the fourth place team (Venezuela) at the championship was also invited.  After the United States (the only team other than Canada in the North America Sub-Zone) automatically qualified for the 2012 Summer Olympics by winning the 2010 FIBA World Championship, they withdrew from the tournament.  The fifth place team at the 2010 South American Basketball Championship (Paraguay) was then invited to participate.

Below is the final list of participants in the tournament:

South American Sub-Zone (South American Basketball Championship 2010):

North America Sub-Zone:

Central American and Caribbean Zone (2010 Centrobasket):

NBA lockout 
Due to the 2011 NBA lockout, insurance costs for players affiliated with teams of the National Basketball Association to play overseas would no longer be afforded by the league and would have to be taken care of by their corresponding national federations. Some national teams, such as the host nation Argentina and Puerto Rico took steps to resolve the issue. Below is a list of players whose participation in the tournament was at least potentially affected:

Carlos Delfino (Milwaukee Bucks)
Manu Ginóbili (San Antonio Spurs)
Andrés Nocioni (Philadelphia 76ers)
Luis Scola (Houston Rockets)

Leandro Barbosa (Toronto Raptors)
Nenê Hilário  (Denver Nuggets)
Tiago Splitter (San Antonio Spurs)
Anderson Varejão  (Cleveland Cavaliers)

Joel Anthony (Miami Heat)
Steve Nash (Phoenix Suns)
Andy Rautins (New York Knicks)
Tristan Thompson (Cleveland Cavaliers)
Jamaal Magloire (Miami Heat)

Francisco García (Sacramento Kings)
Al Horford (Atlanta Hawks)
Charlie Villanueva (Detroit Pistons)

Gary Forbes (Denver Nuggets)

Carlos Arroyo (Boston Celtics)
Renaldo Balkman (New York Knicks)
José Juan Barea (Dallas Mavericks)

Greivis Vásquez (Memphis Grizzlies)

Notes:
 Barbosa decided not to participate in the tournament.
 Nash has retired from international play.
 Thompson and Magloire were not called up for Canada's national team.
 Nenê decided not to participate in the tournament.
 Varejão was unavailable for the tournament due to injury.

Format
The ten teams are split into two groups. The best four teams of each group advance to the second round, where the teams play against the four teams from the other group; each team carries over all points earned during the first round, except for those earned in the match against the team that was eliminated. The best four teams of this group advance to the semifinals.

The two winners in the semifinals automatically qualify for the Olympics. The remaining three teams from the second round plus seven teams from other continents play the 2012 FIBA World Olympic Qualifying Tournament, where the top three qualify for the Olympics.

Squads

Draw
The draw took place on January 27, 2011 at the NH Gran Hotel Provincial in Mar del Plata. Notable ESPN Latin America announcer Álvaro Martin conducted the ceremony while FIBA Americas Secretary General Alberto Garcia and a number of sports figures drew the teams. The ten participating squads were paired in five pots, where the first draw from each pot would go to Group A and the second to Group B. Teams were paired according to their world rankings for balance purposes. Being the host, Argentina had the opportunity to choose their group.

Note
 NR – Not Ranked

Preliminary round

Group A

All times local (UTC−3)

Group B

All times local (UTC−3)

Second round

All times local (UTC−3)

Final round

Semifinals

Third place game

Final

Awards

Statistical leaders

Individual Tournament Highs

Points

Rebounds

Assists

Steals

Blocks

Individual Game Highs

Team Tournament Highs

Offensive PPG

Defensive PPG

Rebounds

Assists

Steals

Blocks

Team Game highs

Final ranking

All-Tournament Team

G –  Marcelinho Huertas
G –  Carlos Arroyo 
F –  Manu Ginóbili
F –  Luis Scola (Tournament MVP)
C –  Al Horford

See also
2011 FIBA Americas Championship for Women

References

External links

 
FIBA AmeriCup
2011–12 in North American basketball
2011–12 in South American basketball
2011–12 in Argentine basketball
International basketball competitions hosted by Argentina